Thomas Thomas is the name of:

Entertainment
 Thomas Thomas (harpist) (1829–1913), Welsh
 Thomas Henry Thomas (1839–1915), Welsh artist better known as T. H. Thomas
 Thomas L. Thomas (1911–1983), Welsh American baritone concert singer
 Thomas Thurston Thomas (born 1948), American science fiction writer
 Thomas, Thomas, German short comedy film

Politics
 Thomas Shenton Thomas (1879–1962), last Governor of Straits Settlements
 Thomas Thomas (trade unionist), Singaporean politician
 Thomas K. Thomas, Indian politician

Religion
 Thomas Thomas (architect) (1817–1888), Welsh church minister and chapel architect
 Thomas Thomas (priest) (1804–1877), Welsh cleric ("Thomas of Caernarfon")
 Thomas Llewellyn Thomas (1840–1897), clergyman and scholar of the Welsh language

Other
 Thomas John Thomas (1877–?), Welsh international footballer
 Thomas Thomas (boxer) (1880–1911), first UK middleweight boxing champion
 Thomas Thomas (surgeon) (1917–1998), Indian thoracic surgeon and writer
 Thomas Thomas, senior architect at T. Thomas and Son

See also 
 Tommy Thomas (disambiguation)
 Tom Thomas (disambiguation)
 Thomas (surname)